Joaquín Carmelo Borobia Isasa (16 August 1939 – 23 April 2022) was a Spanish prelate of the Catholic Church.

Borobia Isasa was born in Spain and was ordained to the priesthood in 1959. He served as auxiliary bishop of the Roman Catholic Archdiocese of Zaragoza, Spain and as titular bishop of Elo from 1990 to 1996. He then served as bishop of the Roman Catholic Diocese of Tarazona, Spain, from 1996 to 2004 and then as auxiliary bishop of the Roman Catholic Archdiocese of Toledo, Spain and as titular bishop of Rubicon from 1994 until his retirement.

References

1939 births
2022 deaths
Spanish Roman Catholic bishops
20th-century Roman Catholic bishops in Spain
21st-century Roman Catholic bishops in Spain
Bishops of Tarazona
Bishops appointed by Pope John Paul II
Bishops appointed by Pope Benedict XVI
Pontifical University of Salamanca alumni